7-Phloroeckol is a phlorotannin found in the edible brown algae arame (Ecklonia bicyclis) and turuarame (Ecklonia stolonifera).

References 

Phlorotannins
Dibenzodioxins